Jarron Kendrick Gilbert (born September 30, 1986) is a former American football defensive end. He was drafted by the Chicago Bears in the third round of the 2009 NFL Draft. He played college football at San Jose State. Gilbert has also been a member of the New York Jets and Buffalo Bills.

High school 
Lettered in football, basketball, and track and field at Chino High School in Chino, California. Gilbert was an All-Sierra League selection in football and basketball.  His father Daren Gilbert played for the New Orleans Saints from 1985 to 1988.

College career 
In 2006, he played 13 games with 10 starts. He had 32 tackles including 7.5 for losses and 5 sacks with 6 pass deflected. In 2005, he played 10 games with 3 starts and was credited with 22 tackles and 3.0 quarterback sacks in 2005 with 5 of the tackles for a loss and he deflected 2 passes.

In 2007 Gilbert played and started 12 games and had 39 (23 solo 16 assisted) tackles, (7.5 for a loss) and 4 Sacks and 4 pass deflections and forced a fumble. He earned 2007 second-team All-Western Athletic Conference.

As a senior in 2008 Gilbert totaled 52 Tackles with 22.0 (which led the NCAA) for losses and 9.5 Sacks. He also had 3 passes defensed, and forced 2 fumbles. He was an All-Western Athletic Conference First-team choice and named the league's co-Defensive Player of the Year. Gilbert was also the team captain was also named the team's Most Valuable Player. Gilbert graduated from San Jose State with a B.A. in sociology in December 2008.

Career statistics 

Key: GP - games played; GS - games started; UA - unassisted tackles; AT - assisted tackles; TT - total tackles; T/L - tackles for a loss; Sacks - ; FF – Forced fumble ; FR – Fumbles recovered; PD - passes deflected; Int - interceptions

Professional career

Pre-draft 
Prior to the 2009 NFL Draft, Gilbert gained Internet notoriety for a YouTube video featuring him jumping out of a swimming pool.

Chicago Bears

New York Jets 
On September 7, 2010, the New York Jets claimed Gilbert off of waivers. Gilbert was assigned to the team's practice squad. On October 27, 2010, Gilbert was promoted to the active roster. Gilbert was waived by the team on November 18, 2010. Gilbert re-signed to the team's practice squad the following day. Gilbert was waived on September 3, 2011. He was re-signed to the practice squad on September 4, 2011. Gilbert was released from the practice squad on November 9, 2011.

Gilbert was re-signed to the team's practice squad on November 19, 2011.

Buffalo Bills 
Gilbert was signed to the Buffalo Bills' active roster on December 17, 2011. The Bills waived Gilbert on August 31, 2012. On December 31, 2012, the Bills signed Gilbert to a future contract. Gilbert was waived on August 30, 2013.

Personal life
Gilbert is cousins with three-time NBA champion, JaVale McGee and current WNBA player, Imani McGee-Stafford.

References

External links 
New York Jets bio
Chicago Bears bio
San Jose State Spartans bio

1986 births
Living people
People from Chino, California
Sportspeople from San Bernardino County, California
American football defensive ends
American football defensive tackles
Players of American football from California
Players of American football from New Orleans
San Jose State Spartans football players
Chicago Bears players
New York Jets players
Buffalo Bills players